Matej Strapák (born 28 June 1993) is a Slovak footballer who plays as a goalkeeper for Austrian club SC Apetlon.

Club career
He made his league debut for Trnava on 5 October 2013 against Trenčín.

References

External links
Matej Strapák at ÖFB

1993 births
Living people
Slovak footballers
Slovak expatriate footballers
Association football goalkeepers
FC Spartak Trnava players
Slovak Super Liga players
Sportspeople from Trnava
Slovak expatriate sportspeople in Austria
Expatriate footballers in Austria